Interpersonal trauma is psychological trauma as a result of interactions between people.  It can result in post-traumatic stress disorder (PTSD). Chronic, sustained interpersonal trauma can result in complex post-traumatic stress disorder, which has both symptoms of PTSD and also problems in developmental areas such as emotional self-regulation and interpersonal functioning.  More than half of the incidents causing interpersonal trauma happen to children and teenagers.

Common categories 

 Child abuse
 Child neglect
 Child sexual abuse
 Intimate partner violence
 Infidelity, leading to Post infidelity stress disorder
 Sexual assault
 Community violence (witnessing or being victimized by intentional violence outside the home)
 Physical assault
 Human trafficking
 Historical trauma
 Combat-related trauma

References 

Trauma types